Canton Independent School District is a public school district based in Canton, Texas (USA).

Schools
There are four campuses in Canton ISD - 
Canton High School (Grades 9-12) 
Canton Jr. High School (Grades 6-8) 
Canton Intermediate School (Grades 3-5)
Canton Elementary School (Grades PK-2)

In 2009, the school district was rated "recognized" by the Texas Education Agency.

Statistics (per 2006)
The attendance rate for students in the district is 97%, compared with a state average of 96%. 32% of the students in the district are economically disadvantaged, 10% enroll in special education, 5% enroll in gifted and talent programs, 22% are enrolled in career and technology programs, and 3% are considered "limited English proficient."

The ethnic makeup of the district is 87% White, non-Hispanic, 8% Hispanic, 3% African American, 1% Asian/Pacific Islander, and 1% Native American.

Teachers in the district carry, on average, 15 years of teaching experience and 4% of the teachers on staff are first-year teachers. 83% of the teachers hold bachelors, 16% hold master's, and less than 1% hold doctorates.

72% of students in the district took SAT/ACT standardized examinations with an average score of 1026 and 21, respectively. 20% of students took an AP and/or IB examination.

See also
List of school districts in Texas
Canton, TX

References

External links
 
 Canton High School 3 time State UIL Champion Marching Eagle Band
 KWJB RADIO broadcasting East Texas high school sports

School districts in Van Zandt County, Texas